FC Eintracht Norderstedt 03 is a German football club based in Norderstedt, Schleswig-Holstein, currently playing in the Regionalliga Nord (IV).

History 
The team was founded in 1945 as SV Eintracht Garstedt, which joined 1. SC Norderstedt in 1972. 1. SC was established just two years earlier on 7 January 1970 as Tanzportverein Norderstedt. The football department split from the club in 2003 to create FC Eintracht Norderstedt 03.

Playing as 1. SC, the footballers were part of the Amateuroberliga Nord (III) for seven seasons from 1987–1994. They finished second there in 1993 and took part in the promotion round for the 2. Bundesliga where they performed poorly. The following season they crashed out of Amateuroberliga play after a 15th-place result. The team rebounded, earning a second-place result in the Oberliga Hamburg/Schleswig-Holstein (IV), and the following year joined the new Regionalliga Nord (III). 1. SC faced relegation after ending the 1997–98 season in 16th, but escaped demotion due to the withdrawal of VfL Hamburg 93. They played two more seasons as a mid-table side in the Regionalliga, before again becoming part of the Oberliga Hamburg/Schleswig-Holstein (IV) following league reorganization. Despite a strong 3rd-place finish in 2002, they withdrew from the Oberliga the next year.

The team has made two appearances in play for the DFB-Pokal (German Cup), going out in the opening rounds in 1996 and 2000.

Following their departure from the club in 2003, the footballers – now playing as FC Eintracht – restarted in the Kreisliga (VIII) competition and climbed back to fifth tier competition after three consecutive promotions. In 2013, the club was given a Regionalliga license and was promoted to the Regionalliga Nord.

Stadium 

FC Eintracht Norderstedt 03 plays its home fixtures at the 5,068 capacity Edmund-Plambeck-Stadion.

Current squad

Honours
 Landesliga Hamburg-Hansa
 Champions: 1977, 2006
 Hamburg Cup
 Winners: 1995, 1999, 2016, 2017, 2020, 2021

References

External links 
 FC Eintracht Norderstedt 03 

Football clubs in Germany
Football clubs in Schleswig-Holstein
Association football clubs established in 2003
2003 establishments in Germany